Aerin Rebecca Lauder Zinterhofer (born April 23, 1970) is an American billionaire heiress and businesswoman.

Family and education
Lauder is the daughter of Jo Carole Lauder (née Knopf) and Ronald Lauder. Her father served as U.S. Ambassador to Austria under President Ronald Reagan, and is the president of the World Jewish Congress. She is the granddaughter of Estée Lauder and Joseph Lauder, the cofounders of the cosmetics company Estée Lauder Companies. She has one sister, Jane Lauder Warsh.

Lauder graduated from University of Pennsylvania. She worked at the family company during and after college. She then studied at the Annenberg School for Communication at the University of Pennsylvania.

Career
Lauder is the style and image director for the Estée Lauder Companies and has her own cosmetic, perfume, fashion, and furniture line named AERIN. She also has a furniture and accessories collection.

She owns 16 million shares in the Estée Lauder Companies making her worth $2.7 billion as of 2019 and ranking her 319 on the Forbes 400 list of richest Americans.

Personal life
In 1996, Lauder married Eric Zinterhofer in a Jewish ceremony in Wainscott, New York. Zinterhofer is an investment banker, the co-founder of the private equity firm Searchlight Capital Partners and the former co-head of media and telecommunications investing at Apollo Global Management. The couple lives in New York City and East Hampton, New York with their two sons. She also has a home in Aspen, Colorado.

Works and publications 
 Lauder, Aerin, Christine Pittle, and Simon Upton. Beauty at Home. New York: Clarkson Potter, 2013.  
 Smith, Clinton Ross, and Aerin Lauder. Veranda: The Romance of Flowers. 2015. Foreword by Lauder.  
 Lauder, Aerin. Aspen Style. New York: Assouline, 2017. 
 Lauder, Aerin. Palm Beach. New York: Assouline, 2019.

See also 
 Estée Lauder Companies
 Lauder family

References

External links
 AERIN

1970 births
Living people
American billionaires
American corporate directors
American cosmetics businesspeople
American people of Austrian-Jewish descent
American people of Czech-Jewish descent
American people of Hungarian-Jewish descent
American people of Slovak-Jewish descent
Businesspeople from New York City
Lauder family
Female billionaires
Annenberg School for Communication at the University of Pennsylvania alumni